Blue Hotel is an album by Fox released in 1977.

Track listing
All songs by Kenny Young unless noted.
"S-S-S-Single Bed" - 3:50
"Livin' Out My Fantasies" - 3:10
"Dejenina" - 3:41 (Herbie Armstrong, Scott English, Young)
"Blue Hotel" - 4:06 (Armstrong, Young)
"Almond Eyes" - 3:29
"Magic Machine" - 4:01 (Armstrong, Young)
"My Old Man's Away" - 3:37 (Armstrong, Young)
"Moustaches on the Moon" - 3:39
"Under Your Own Umbrella" - 3:01 (Armstrong, Young)
"Friendship Rose" - 2:55
"Make It Like It Used to Be" - 3:04 (Armstrong, Young)

Personnel
Noosha Fox - lead vocals
Jim Gannon - guitar
Herbie Armstrong - guitar
Gary Taylor - bass, vocals
Ann Odell - synthesizer
Peter Solley - keyboards
Bud Beadle - alto saxophone
Martin David - drums, percussion
Glen LeFleur - drums
Phil Becque - engineer

References

1977 albums
Fox (band) albums
GTO Records albums